A petroglyph is an image created by removing part of a rock surface by incising, picking, carving, or abrading, as a form of rock art. Outside North America, scholars often use terms such as "carving", "engraving", or other descriptions of the technique to refer to such images. Petroglyphs, estimated to be 20,000 years old and classified as protected monuments and have been added to the tentative list of UNESCO’s world heritage sites. Petroglyphs are found worldwide, and are often associated with prehistoric peoples.

Another form of petroglyph, normally found in literate cultures, a rock relief or rock-cut relief is a relief sculpture carved on "living rock" such as a cliff, rather than a detached piece of stone. While these relief carvings are a category of rock art, sometimes found in conjunction with rock-cut architecture, they tend to be omitted in most works on rock art, which concentrate on engravings and paintings by prehistoric or nonliterate cultures. Some of these reliefs exploit the rock's natural properties to define an image. Rock reliefs have been made in many cultures, especially in the ancient Near East. Rock reliefs are generally fairly large, as they need to be to make an impact in the open air. Most have figures that are larger than life-size.

Stylistically, a culture's rock relief carvings relate to other types of sculpture from the period concerned. Except for Hittite and Persian examples, they are generally discussed as part of the culture's sculptural practice. The vertical relief is most common, but reliefs on essentially horizontal surfaces are also found. The term relief typically excludes relief carvings inside natural or human-made caves, that are common in India. Natural rock formations made into statues or other sculpture in the round, most famously at the Great Sphinx of Giza, are also usually excluded. Reliefs on large boulders left in their natural location, like the Hittite İmamkullu relief, are likely to be included, but smaller boulders described as stele or carved orthostats.

In scholarly texts, a petroglyph is a rock engraving, whereas a petrograph is a rock painting. In common usage, the two words are synonymous. Both types of image belong to the wider and more general category of rock art or parietal art. Petroforms, or patterns and shapes made by many large rocks and boulders over the ground, are also quite different. Inuksuit are also not petroglyphs, they are human-made rock forms found only in the Arctic region.

History 

Petroglyphs have been found in all parts of the globe except Antarctica, with highest concentrations in parts of Africa, Scandinavia and Siberia, many examples of petroglyphs found globally are dated to approximately the Neolithic and late Upper Paleolithic boundary (roughly 10,000 to 12,000 years ago).

Around 7,000 to 9,000 years ago, following the introduction of a number of precursors of writing systems, the existence and creation of petroglyphs began to suffer and tail off, with different forms of art, such as pictographs and ideograms, taking their place. However, petroglyphs continued to be created and remained somewhat common, with various cultures continuing to use them for differing lengths of time, including cultures who continued to create them until contact with Western culture was made in the 19th and 20th centuries.

Interpretation
Many hypotheses exist as to the purpose of petroglyphs, depending on their location, age, and subject matter. Some petroglyph images most likely held a deep cultural and religious significance for the societies that created them. Many petroglyphs are thought to represent a type of symbolic or ritualistic language or communication style that remains not fully understood. Others, such as geocontourglyphs, more clearly depict or represent a landform or the surrounding terrain, such as rivers and other geographic features.

Some petroglyph maps, depicting trails, as well as containing symbols communicating the time and distances travelled along those trails, exist; other petroglyph maps act as astronomical markers. As well as holding geographic and astronomical importance, other petroglyphs may also have been a by-product of various rituals: sites in India, for example, have seen some petroglyphs identified as musical instruments or "rock gongs".

Some petroglyphs likely formed types of symbolic communication, such as types of proto-writing. Later glyphs from the Nordic Bronze Age in Scandinavia seem to refer to some form of territorial boundary between tribes, in addition to holding possible religious meanings. Petroglyph styles have been recognised as having local or regional "dialects" from similar or neighboring peoples. Siberian inscriptions loosely resemble an early form of runes, although no direct relationship has been established.

Petroglyphs from different continents show similarities. While people would be inspired by their direct surroundings, it is harder to explain the common styles. This could be mere coincidence, an indication that certain groups of people migrated widely from some initial common area, or indication of a common origin. In 1853, George Tate presented a paper to the Berwick Naturalists' Club, at which a John Collingwood Bruce agreed that the carvings had "... a common origin, and indicate a symbolic meaning, representing some popular thought." In his cataloguing of Scottish rock art, Ronald Morris summarized 104 different theories on their interpretation.

More controversial explanations of similarities are grounded in Jungian psychology and the views of Mircea Eliade. According to these theories it is possible that the similarity of petroglyphs (and other atavistic or archetypal symbols) from different cultures and continents is a result of the genetically inherited structure of the human brain.

Other theories suggest that petroglyphs were carved by spiritual leaders, such as shamans, in an altered state of consciousness, perhaps induced by the use of natural hallucinogens. Many of the geometric patterns (known as form constants) which recur in petroglyphs and cave paintings have been shown by David Lewis-Williams to be hardwired into the human brain. They frequently occur in visual disturbances and hallucinations brought on by drugs, migraine, and other stimuli.

Recent analysis of surveyed and GPS-logged petroglyphs around the world has identified commonalities indicating pre-historic (7,000–3,000 BCE) intense auroras, or natural light display in the sky, observable across the continents.

The Rock Art Research Institute (RARI) of the University of the Witwatersrand studies present-day links between religion and rock art among the San people of the Kalahari Desert. Though the San people's artworks are predominantly paintings, the beliefs behind them can perhaps be used as a basis for understanding other types of rock art, including petroglyphs. To quote from the RARI website:
Using knowledge of San beliefs, researchers have shown that the art played a fundamental part in the religious lives of its painters. The art captured things from the San's world behind the rock-face: the other world inhabited by spirit creatures, to which dancers could travel in animal form, and where people of ecstasy could draw power and bring it back for healing, rain-making and capturing the game.

List of petroglyph sites

Africa

Algeria 
 Tassili n'Ajjer

Cameroon 
 Bidzar

Central African Republic 
 Bambari, Lengo and Bangassou in the south; Bwale in the west
 Toulou
 Djebel Mela
 Koumbala

Chad 
 Niola Doa

Republic of the Congo 
 The Niari Valley, 250 km south west of Brazzaville

Egypt 
 Wadi Hammamat in Qift, many carvings and inscriptions dating from before the earliest Egyptian Dynasties to the modern era, including the only painted petroglyph known from the Eastern Desert and drawings of Egyptian reed boats dated to 4000 BCE
 Inscription Rock in South Sinai, is a large rock with carvings and writings ranging from Nabatean to Latin, Ancient Greek and Crusader eras located a few miles from the Ain Hudra Oasis. A second rock sites approximately 1 km from the main rock near the Nabatean tombs of Nawamis with carvings of animals including Camels, Gazelles and others. The original archaeologists who investigated these in the 1800s have also left their names carved on this rock.
 Giraffe petroglyphs found in the region of Gebel el-Silsila. The rock faces have been used for extensive quarrying of materials for temple building especially during the period specified as the New Kingdom. The Giraffe depictions are located near a stela of the king Amenhotep IV. The images are not dated, but they are probably dated from the Predynastic periods.

Ethiopia 
 Tiya

Gabon 
 Ogooue River Valley
 Epona
 Elarmekora
 Kongo Boumba
 Lindili
 Kaya Kaya

Libya 
 Akakus
 Jebel Uweinat

Morocco 
 The Draa River valley

Namibia 
 Twyfelfontein

Niger 
 Life-size giraffe carvings on Dabous Rock, Aïr Mountains

South Africa 
 Driekops Eiland near Kimberley
 ǀXam and ǂKhomani heartland in the Karoo, Northern Cape
 Wildebeest Kuil Rock Art Centre near Kimberley, Northern Cape
 Keiskie near Calvinia, Northern Cape
Tunisia

 Ouesslat Mountain, Ain Kanfous and Zamla
 Tameghza
 The Tataouine Region, in particular Ghomrassen and Smar

Zambia 
 Nyambwezi Falls in the north-west province.

Asia

Armenia 

 Ughtasar
 Urtsadzor
 Aragats
 See also Armenian Eternity sign

Azerbaijan 
 Gobustan State Reserve
 Gemigaya
 Kalbajar
 Northern Absheron

China 

 Helan Mountains in Yinchuan
 Hua'an Engravings
 Kangjia shimenzi in Xinjiang
 Lianyungan Rock Engravings
 Petroglyphs in Zhuhai
 Yin Mountains in Inner Mongolia
 Chifeng Petroglyphs in Inner Mongolia

Georgia 
 Trialeti petroglyphs

Hong Kong 
Eight sites in Hong Kong:
 Tung Lung Island
 Kau Sai Chau
 Po Toi Island
 Cheung Chau
 Shek Pik on Lantau Island
 Wong Chuk Hang and Big Wave Bay on Hong Kong Island
 Lung Ha Wan in Sai Kung

India 

 Bhimbetka rock shelters, Raisen District, Madhya Pradesh, India.
 Kupgal petroglyphs on Dolerite Dyke, near Bellary, Karnataka, India.
 Kudopi, Sindhudurg District, Maharashtra, India.
 Hiwale, Sindhudurg District, Maharashtra, India.
 Barsu, Ratnagiri District, Maharashtra, India.
 Devihasol, Ratnagiri District, Maharashtra, India
 Edakkal Caves, Wayanad District, Kerala, India.
 Kollur, Triukoilur 35 km from Villupuram in Tamil Nadu. A large dolmen with four petroglyphs that portray men with trident and a wheel with spokes has been found. The discovery was made by K.T. Gandhirajan. This is the second instance when a dolmen with petrographs has been found in Tamil Nadu, India. In October 2018, petroglyphs were discovered in the Ratnagiri and Rajapur areas in the Konkan region of western Maharashtra. Those rock carvings which might date back to 10,000 BC, depict animals like hippopotamuses and rhinoceroses which aren't found in that region of India. Some carving depicts, what appears to be Pisces constellation.* Perumukkal, Tindivanam District, Tamil Nadu, India.
 Kollur, Villupuram, Tamil Nadu.
 Unakoti near Kailashahar in North Tripura District, Tripura, India.
 Usgalimal rock engravings, Kushavati river banks, in Goa
 Ladakhi rock art in Ladakh, NW Indian Himalaya.
Ratnagiri Maharashtra Petroglyphs, An eight ftlong petroglyph in Devache Gothane village in Rajapur district, Maharashtra..
Kethaiyurumpu, Tamil Nadu.  Situated 28 km north west of Dindigal, Tamil Nadu nearby Idaiyakottai and six km south west of Oddanchartam has revealed several petroglyphs mostly represent abstract symbols on two rocks, which looks like a temporary rock shelter were noticed adjacent to a Murugan temple which is in ruins on top of the Kothaiyurumbu hill.

Iran 

During recent years a large number of rock carvings has been identified in different parts of Iran. The vast majority depict the ibex. Rock drawings were found in December 2016 near Golpayegan, Iran, which may be the oldest drawings discovered, with one cluster possibly 40,000 years old. Accurate estimations were unavailable due to US sanctions.

Petroglyphs are the most ancient works of art left by humankind that provide an opening to the past eras of life and help us to discover different aspects of prehistoric lives. Tools to create petroglyphs can be classified by the age and the historical era; they could be flint, thighbone of hunted quarries, or metallic tools. The oldest pictographs in Iran are seen in Yafteh cave in Lorestan that date back 40,000 and the oldest petroglyph discovered belongs to Timareh dating back to 40,800 years ago.

Iran provides demonstrations of script formation from pictogram, ideogram, linear (2300 BC) or proto Elamite, geometric old Elamite script, Pahlevi script, Arabic script (906 years ago), Kufi script, and Farsi script back to at least 250 years ago. More than 50000 petroglyphs have been discovered, extended over all Iran's states.

Israel 
 Kibbutz Ginosar
 Har Karkom
 Negev

Japan 
 Awashima shrine (Kitakyūshū city)
 Fugoppe Cave, Hokkaido
 Hikoshima (Shimonoseki city)
 Miyajima
 Temiya cave (Otaru city)

Jordan 
 Wadi Rum
 Wadi Faynan

Kazakhstan 

 Koksu River, in Almaty Province
 Chumysh River basin,
 Tamgaly Tas on the Ili River
 Tamgaly – a World Heritage Site nearly of Almaty

Laos 
 Plain of Jars

South Korea 
 Bangudae Petroglyphs

Kyrgyzstan 
 Several sites in the Tien Shan mountains: Cholpon-Ata, the Talas valley, Saimaluu Tash, and on the rock outcrop called Suleiman's Throne in Osh in the Fergana valley

Macau 
 Coloane

Malaysia 
 Lumuyu Petroglyphs

Mongolia 
 Petroglyphic Complexes of the Mongolian Altai, UNESCO World Heritage site, 2011

Pakistan 
 Ancient Rock Carvings of Sindh
 Rock art and petroglyphs in Northern Areas,

Philippines 
 Angono Petroglyphs of Rizal, Philippines

Saudi Arabia 

 "Graffiti Rocks", about 110 km SW of Riyadh off the Mecca highway
 Arwa, west of Riyadh
 al Jawf, near al Jawf
 Jubbah, Umm Samnan, north of Hail
 Janin Cave, south of Hail
 Yatib, south of Hail
 Milihiya, south of Hail
 Jebel al Lawz, north of Tabuk
 Wadi Damm, near Tabuk
 Wadi Abu Oud, near al Ula
 Shuwaymis, north of Madina
 Jebel al Manjour & Ratt, north of Madina
 Hanakiya, north of Madina
 Shimli
 Bir Hima, north of Najran
 Tathleeth, north of Najran
 Al-Magar, in Najd

Taiwan 
 The Wanshan Rock Carvings Archeological Site near Maolin District, Kaohsiung, were discovered between 1978 and 2002.

Thailand 
 Pha Taem National Park

Vietnam 
 Rock engravings in Sapa, Sa Pa, Lào Cai Province
 Rock engravings in Namdan, Xín Mần District, Hà Giang Province

Yemen 
 Eriosh Petroglyphs, island of Socotra

Europe

England 
 Boscawen-un, St Buryan
 Cup and ring marked rocks in:
 Northumberland,
 County Durham,
 Ilkley Moor, Yorkshire,
 Gardom's Edge, Derbyshire,
 Creswell Crags, Nottingham

Finland 
 Hauensuoli, Hanko, Finland

France 
 Vallée des Merveilles, Mercantour National Park, France

Ireland 
 Newgrange
 Knowth
 Dowth
 Loughcrew
 Tara
 Clonfinlough Stone
 Boheh Stone

Italy 
 Rock Drawings in Valcamonica – World Heritage Site, Italy (biggest European site, over 350,000)
 Bagnolo stele, Valcamonica, Italy
 Grotta del Genovese, Sicily, Italy
 Grotta dell'Addaura, Sicily, Italy
 Rock Engravings in Grosio (in Valtellina), Italy

Northern Ireland 
 Knockmany

 Sess Kilgreen

Norway 

 Rock carvings at Alta, World Heritage Site (1985)
 Rock carvings in Central Norway
 Rock carvings at Møllerstufossen
 Rock carvings at Tennes

Portugal 
 Prehistoric Rock Art Sites in the Côa Valley, Portugal

Scotland 
 Museum of Ayrshire Country Life and Costume, North Ayrshire
 Burghead Bull, Burghead
 Townhead, Galloway
 Ballochmyle cup and ring marks

Spain 

 Petroglyphs from Galicia
 Petroglyphs from the Canary Islands (Spain)

Russia 

 White Sea petroglyphs, Republic of Karelia, Russia
 Petroglyph Park near Petrozavodsk–Lake Onega, Russia
 Tomskaya Pisanitsa
 Kanozero Petroglyphs
 Sikachi-Alyan, Khabarovsk Krai
 Kapova cave, Bashkortostan
 Sunduki Petroglyphs, Khakassia

Sweden 
 Tanumshede (Bohuslän); World Heritage Site (1994)
 Himmelstalund (by Norrköping in Östergötland)
 Enköping (Uppland)
 Southwest Skåne (Götaland)
 Alvhem (Västra Götaland)
 Torhamn (Blekinge)
 Nämforsen (Ångermanland)
 Häljesta (Västmanland)
 Slagsta (Södermanland)
 Glösa (Jämtland)
 Gärde (Jämtland)
 Flatruet (Härjedalen)
 Grannberget (Härjedalen)
 The King's Grave at Kivik
 Rock carvings at Norrfors, Umeå
 Släbro rock carvings in Nyköping (Södermanland)

Turkey 
 Kagizman, Kars
 Cunni Cave, Erzurum
 Esatli, Ordu
 Gevaruk Valley, Hakkâri
 Hakkari Trisin, Hakkâri
 Latmos / Beşparmak
 Güdül, Ankara

Ukraine 
 Kamyana Mohyla, Zaporizhzhia Oblast
 Stone stelae of the Ukraine

Wales 
 Garn Turne, Pembrokeshire

Central and South America and the Caribbean

Argentina 
 Cueva de las Manos, Santa Cruz
 Talampaya National Park, La Rioja
 Lihué Calel National Park, La Pampa

Aruba 
 Arikok National Park
 Quadiriki Caves
 Ayo Rock Formations

Brazil 
The oldest reliably dated rock art in the Americas is known as the "Horny Little Man." It is petroglyph depicting a stick figure with an oversized phallus and carved in Lapa do Santo, a cave in central-eastern Brazil and dates from 12,000 to 9,000 years ago.
 Serra da Capivara National Park, a UNESCO World Heritage Site, Piauí
 Vale do Catimbau National Park, Pernambuco
 Ingá Stone, Paraíba
 Costao do Santinho, Santa Catarina
 Lagoa Santa (Holy Lake), Minas Gerais
 Ivolandia, Goiás

Chile 
 Rincón las Chilcas, Combarbalá
 Easter Island petroglyphs

Colombia 
 El Abra, Cundinamarca
 Chiribiquete Natural National Park

Costa Rica 
 Rincon de la Vieja, Guanacaste

Dominican Republic 
 Cueva de las Maravillas, San Pedro de Macorís
 Las Caritas, near Lake Enriquillo
 Los Tres Ojos, Santo Domingo

Grenada 
 Mt. Rich Petroglyphs

Montserrat 

 Soldier Ghaut petroglyphs

Nicaragua 
 El Ceibo Petroglyphs, Ometepe, Rivas
 Ometepe Petroglyphs, Ometepe, Rivas

Paraguay 

 Amambay Department

Peru 
 Cumbe Mayo, Cajamarca
 Petroglyphs of Pusharo, Manú National Park, Madre de Dios region
 Petroglyphs of Quiaca, Puno Region
 Petroglyphs of Jinkiori, Cusco Region

Saint Kitts and Nevis 
 Carib Petroglyphs, Wingfield Manor Estate, Saint Kitts

Suriname 
 Corantijn Basin

Trinidad and Tobago 
 Caurita

Venezuela 
 Caicara del Orinoco, Bolívar
 Morrocoy National Park, Falcón
 Piedra Pintada Archeological Park within San Esteban National Park, Guaraca, Carabobo
 Sardinata Beach, Amazonas
 Taima Taima, Falcón

North America

Canada 
 Kejimkujik National Park, Nova Scotia
 Petroglyph Provincial Park, Nanaimo, British Columbia
 Petroglyphs Provincial Park, north of Peterborough, Ontario
 Agnes Lake, Quetico Provincial Park, Ontario
 Sproat Lake Provincial Park, near Port Alberni, British Columbia
 Stuart Lake, British Columbia
 St. Victor Provincial Park, Saskatchewan
 Writing-on-Stone Provincial Park, east of Milk River, Alberta
 Gabriola Island, British Columbia
 East Sooke Regional Park, British Columbia
 Ancient Echoes Interpretive Centre, Herschel Saskatchewan
 Lake Temagami, Ontario

Mexico 

 Boca de Potrerillos, Mina, Nuevo León
 Chiquihuitillos, Mina, Nuevo León
 Cuenca del Río Victoria, near Xichú, Guanajuato
 Coahuiltecan Cueva Ahumada, Nuevo León
 La Proveedora, Caborca, Sonora
 Samalayuca, Juarez, Chihuahua
 Las Labradas, near Mazatlán, Sinaloa

United States

 Arches National Park, Utah
 Bandelier National Monument, New Mexico
 Barnesville Petroglyph, Ohio
 Bloomington Petroglyph Park, Utah
 Capitol Reef National Park, Utah
 Caguana Indian Park, Utuado, Puerto Rico
 Columbia Hills State Park, Washington
 Corn Springs, Colorado Desert, California
 Coso Rock Art District, Coso Range, northern Mojave Desert, California
 Death Valley National Park, California
 Dinosaur National Monument, Colorado and Utah
 Dighton Rock, Massachusetts
 Dominguez Canyon Wilderness, Colorado
 Fremont Indian State Park Utah
 Ginkgo Petrified Forest State Park Washington
 Grand Traverse Bay Michigan
 Great Basin National Park Nevada
 Grimes Point, Nevada
 Independence Slab, Ohio
 Inscription Rock (Kelleys Island, Ohio), Ohio
 Jeffers Petroglyphs, Minnesota
 Judaculla Rock, North Carolina
 Kanopolis State Park, Kansas
 La Cueva del Indio (Indians Cave), Arecibo, Puerto Rico
 La Piedra Escrita (The Written Rock), Jayuya, Puerto Rico
 Lava Beds National Monument, Tule Lake, California
 Legend Rock Petroglyph Site, Thermopolis, Wyoming
 Lemonweir Glyphs, Wisconsin
 Leo Petroglyph, Leo, Ohio
 Mesa Verde National Park, Colorado
 Newspaper Rock State Historic Monument, Utah
 Olympic National Park, Washington
 Paintlick Mountain, Tazewell, Virginia
 Petit Jean State Park, Arkansas
 Petrified Forest National Park Arizona
 Petroglyph National Monument, New Mexico
 Picacho Mountain, Picacho Arizona
 Picture Canyon, Flagstaff, Arizona
 Picture Rocks, Picture Rocks, Arizona
 Puye Cliff Dwellings, New Mexico
 Red Rock Canyon National Conservation Area, Nevada
 Rochester Rock Art Panel, Utah
 Ring Mountain, Marin County, California
 Saint John, U.S. Virgin Islands
 Sanilac Petroglyphs Historic State Park, Sanilac County, Michigan
 Sedona, Arizona
 Seminole Canyon, Texas
 Sloan Canyon National Conservation Area, Nevada
 South Mountain Park, Arizona
 The Cove Palisades State Park, Oregon
 Three Rivers Petroglyphs, New Mexico
 Tibes Indian Park, Ponce, Puerto Rico
 Valley of Fire State Park, Nevada
 Washington State Park, Washington County, Missouri
 West Virginia glyphs
 White Mountain (Wyoming), Rock Springs, Wyoming
 White Tank Mountain Regional Park, Waddell, Arizona
 Winnemucca Lake, Nevada
 Writing Rock State Historical Site, North Dakota
 Monolyth at Caguas & El Yunque, Puerto Rico
 Track Rock, Union County Georgia
 Forsyth Petroglyph Originally discovered, locates and documented near Cumming, Georgia in Forsyth County but has been relocated to the campus of the University of Georgia in Athens, Georgia

Oceania

Australia 
 Arnhem Land / Kakadu National Park, Northern Australia
 Gosford Glyphs in Central Coast, NSW (widely regarded as archaeological forgery)
 Murujuga, Western Australia – world heritage assessed
 Sydney Rock Engravings, New South Wales

See also 
 Geoglyph
 History of communication
 List of Stone Age art
 Megalithic art
 Pecked curvilinear nucleated
 Petrosomatoglyph
 Runestone and image stone
 Water glyphs

References 

 Harmanşah, Ömür (ed) (2014), Of Rocks and Water: An Archaeology of Place, 2014, Oxbow Books, 9781782976745
 Rawson, Jessica (ed). The British Museum Book of Chinese Art, 2007 (2nd edn), British Museum Press, 
 Sickman, Laurence, in: Sickman L. & Soper A., The Art and Architecture of China, Pelican History of Art, 3rd ed 1971, Penguin (now Yale History of Art), LOC 70-125675

Further reading 
 Beckensall, Stan and Laurie, Tim, Prehistoric Rock Art of County Durham, Swaledale and Wensleydale, County Durham Books, 1998 
 Beckensall, Stan, Prehistoric Rock Art in Northumberland, Tempus Publishing, 2001

External links 

 Rock Art Studies: A Bibliographic Database Bancroft Library's citations to rock art literature.

 
Rock art